The Saddle Rock-Malibu AVA is an American Viticultural Area in the Santa Monica Mountains, within western Los Angeles County, California. 

The region was once part of the  Saddle Rock Ranch, created from a 19th-century Spanish and Mexican land grant Rancho Las Virgenes. 

The wine region is located high in the Santa Monica Mountains, west of Metropolitan Los Angeles in Southern California.

References 

American Viticultural Areas of Southern California
Geography of Los Angeles County, California
Santa Monica Mountains
American Viticultural Areas of California
American Viticultural Areas
2006 establishments in California